Freestyle skiing is one of the sports featured at the Winter Youth Olympics. In 2012 it included the disciplines of half pipe and ski cross. In 2016, slopestyle was added, also 1 mixed event was held together with snowboarders.

Medalists by Games

2012 Winter Youth Olympics

2016 Winter Youth Olympics

2020 Winter Youth Olympics

Medal table

As of the 2020 Winter Youth Olympics.

See also
Freestyle skiing at the Winter Olympics

References

External links 
 Youth Olympic Games

 
Sports at the Winter Youth Olympics
Youth Olympics